ZFP14 zinc finger protein is a protein that in humans is encoded by the ZFP14 gene.

References

Further reading